Joh for PM is an Australian musical comedy written by Stephen Carleton with music and lyrics by Paul Hodge.

Premise 
The show is a satire about Queensland's longest-serving premier, Sir Joh Bjelke-Petersen. Set at a fundraiser in 1987, Joh for PM follows the life and politics of the former premier, framed on his doomed campaign to become Prime Minister. It covers Bjelke-Petersen's rise and fall, supported by wife Flo and her pumpkin scones.

Production 
The original production starred Colin Lane, Chloe Dallimore, Kurt Phelan, Barbara Lowing, Stephen Hirst and Simon Burvill-Homes. It played at the Brisbane Powerhouse from 7 to 16 July 2017 and Cairns' Centre for Contemporary Arts from 4 to 19 August 2017. It was presented by JUTE Theatre Company and Brisbane Powerhouse in association with the Queensland Music Festival.

Reception 
The musical was generally well received. The Guardian described it as "campy, glorious fun".  The Courier-Mail noted that "it doesn't get any more Queensland than this, right down to the pineapple emblems displayed on the groin areas of various costumes".

Awards 
Joh for PM was nominated for a 2017 Matilda Award for Best Musical or Cabaret.

References 

2017 musicals
Australian musicals

Biographical musicals
Biographical plays about politicians
Plays set in the 1980s
Plays set in Australia
Satirical plays